William Stephen may refer to:

William Fitz Stephen  (died c. 1191), cleric and administrator in the service of Thomas Becket
William Stephani or Stephenson (fl. 1415–1425),  medieval prelate
William Stephen (Australian politician) (1829–1913), New South Wales colonial politician
Bill Stephen (politician) (1921–2013), Victorian (Australia) state politician
Bill Stephen (born 1928), Australian rules footballer

See also

William Stephens (disambiguation)